Mia Michaels Melchiona (known professionally as Mia Michaels; born February 22, 1966) is an American choreographer and judge on the television show So You Think You Can Dance. She has worked with Tom Cruise, Celine Dion, Gloria Estefan, Madonna, Ricky Martin, Prince, and Catherine Zeta-Jones. In 2005 she choreographed Cirque du Soleil's world tour Delirium and Celine Dion's A New Day..., for which she received an Emmy Award nomination. In 2007 she won a Primetime Emmy Award for Outstanding Choreography for her routine on "Calling You" during season two of So You Think You Can Dance. She won another Emmy Award during season five in 2010. She was a judge during season 7 with Adam Shankman and Nigel Lythgoe. She choreographed the dance sequence for "Get Happy" in the episode "Bombshells" of the television series House.

Early life
Mia Michaels was born in Coconut Grove, Florida on February 22, 1966, to a family of dancers. Her father, Joe Michaels, taught her jazz, tap, and ballet from the age of three at the Miami Dance Center. Her sister, Dana Michaels, taught her contemporary dance. Her brother Joe Melchiona owned and taught dance at Heidi & Joe's Dance Center in Miami Florida. While growing up, she attended summer sessions at Interlochen Center for the Arts in Michigan and at Jacob's Pillow in Becket, Massachusetts.

Professional career 
The choreography for Celine Dion's "A New Day" by Michaels, under the direction of Franco Dragone at Caesars' Palace in Las Vegas, received positive reviews. The show features a cast of 50 dancers. Michaels' work can be seen in the first touring show by Cirque du Soleil, Delirium, which premiered in March 2006. She has created works for Madonna, Ricky Martin, Gloria Estefan, Anna Vissi, and Prince.

Michaels is a judge and contributing choreographer for the FOX television show So You Think You Can Dance (abbreviated SYTYCD). She won an Emmy award for her choreography on the television series Calling You on SYTYCD. Her other works in film and television include Cool Women for AMC/DreamWorks Television and commercials for Mike's Hard Lemonade, Bacardi, Coldwell Banker, and Ziper. She also choreographed and played the character Olivia in the dance film Step Up Revolution.

The show's executive producer, Nigel Lythgoe, confirmed on October 15, 2009, Michaels' departure from the show. Lythgoe thanked Michaels for her assistance during the auditions phase of season 6, which was broadcast during the fall of 2009. He also made it known that Michaels was welcome to return to the show at any time during season 6 or in subsequent seasons. Michaels later revealed she left the show to participate as a choreographer for the Canadian and Australian versions of SYTYCD. In addition, Michaels shared she was moving forward on several other projects, including her own choreography show, participating in a documentary/reality show, working on a clothing line, and working on a book deal. Michaels did choreograph a routine for So You Think You Can Dance Canada's second season finale on October 25; the theme of the piece evoked her choice to depart the franchise. During rehearsal in Toronto, she injured her back and could not be present for the live performance. On January 25, 2010 The New York Post claimed she was returning to SYTYCD for season 7.

Since June 2006, Michaels has been a columnist for Movmnt magazine.

In 2010, Bravo announced a television program focusing on Michaels.

Included in her concert and stage work is the dance company RAW (Reality at Work). She is the founder, artistic director, and choreographer since the beginning in 1997. She has created works for the Paper Mill Playhouse's production of Hello Dolly! starring Tovah Feldshuh, Les Ballet Jazz de Montreal, Jazz Dance Chicago, and Oslo Dance Ensemble. Her choreography has been seen off-Broadway in If These Shoes Could Talk and Fort Chaffee.

Michaels was one of many choreographers set to pay tribute to Michael Jackson at the 2009 MTV Video Music Awards. Michaels was to join Wade Robson, Tyce Diorio, Laurie Ann Gibson, Brian Friedman, and other dancer-choreographers in performing with Janet Jackson for her rendition of the song "Scream", but suffered an injury during rehearsals and was unable to perform on the show.

Michaels has been on the faculty of schools including the Harid Conservatory, the Ailey School of the Alvin Ailey American Dance Theater, Broadway Dance Center in New York City, and her alma mater, the New World School of the Arts. Her choreography has been enlisted for the Miami City Ballet, Joffrey II, the Kirov Academy, and the Jazz Theater of Amsterdam. She occasionally joins the staff of the dance convention JUMP. In 2017, she worked with the Joffery Ballet School for a summer intensive program.

When So You Think You Can Dance returned for its ninth season, Michaels returned to the show and choreographed the Top 20 group performance.

In 2012, Michaels choreographed for the film Rock of Ages. In 2015, she provided the choreography for the Broadway musical Finding Neverland. In 2016, she choreographed the New York Christmas Spectacular starring the Rockettes. In 2019, it was announced that Michaels would provide choreography for the 2020 animated film The SpongeBob Movie: It's a Wonderful Sponge.

So You Think You Can Dance

 LVW=Las Vegas Week
 MT20=Meet Top 20

So You Think You Can Dance Canada

Awards and honors

References

1966 births
American women choreographers
American choreographers
American female dancers
American jazz dancers
American dancers
Cirque du Soleil
Contemporary dance choreographers
Dance teachers
Living people
Artists from Miami
So You Think You Can Dance choreographers
21st-century American women